The Deanery of Belthangady or Belthangady Varado is  one of the deaneries which comes under Diocese of Mangalore located at Belthangady, Karnataka, India. This deanery consists 10 parishes and Most Holy Redeemer Church (Belthangady) is the primary parish for this Deanery. Fr. Joseph Cardoza is the current vicar of this Deanery.

History
In 1908, Fr. Piadade D’Souza constructed a new church. Fr. Clifford Dsouza constructed the new parochial house in 1982. Fr. Gregory Dsouza built a chapel at Charmadi. On 10 August 1939, Fr. John G. Pinto established a chapel at Bangady(Indubettu), which became a parish later.  Arva(Aladangady), Indubettu and Naravi parishes were carved out of Belthangady.  Fr. Rosario Fernandes extended the church.

Being located near Jamalabad Fort, built by Mysore ruler Tippu Sultan, this church has a history of more than 125 years. It is a testimony of Christians who sustained faith despite the atrocities of Tippu Sultan. The martyrdom of around eight hundred Christians inspired the faithful to lead a life centered on Christian values. The struggle of Christians and attacks on Churches by Tippu Sultan is now hidden from history due to political reasons to show Tippu Sultan as a  hero in southern part of Karnataka.

Demographics
This Deanery consists 10 parishes and Most Holy Redeemer Church (Belthangady) is the primary parish for this Deanery.

Parish churches
Below ar the list of parishes under Belthangady Varado.
St. Peter Claver Church, Aladangady(Arva)
 St. Raphael Church, Badyar
Most Holy Redeemer Church, Belthangady
St. Francis Xavier Church, Indabettu
Church Of Sacred Heart Of Jesus, Madanthyar
St. Francis Assisi Church, Nainad
St. Antony Church, Naravi
St. Antony Church, Ujire
Christ the King Church, Venur
St. Ann's Church, Nala - Mavinakatte

See also
Roman Catholicism in Mangalore
Goan Catholics
Most Holy Redeemer Church (Belthangady)
Church Higher Primary School, Belthangady
St. Theresa High School, Belthangady
Monsignor Ambrose Madtha
Christianity in Karnataka
Diocese of Belthangady
Syro-Malankara Catholic Eparchy of Puttur

References

Churches in Mangalore Diocese
Culture of Mangalore
Christian clergy from Mangalore